The Kid Rides Again is a 1943 American western directed by Sam Newfield. The film was one of the Billy the Kid (film series by Producers Releasing Corporation.  It was Iris Meredith's last credited feature film role.

Cast 
Buster Crabbe as Billy the Kid
Al St. John as Fuzzy Q. Jones
Iris Meredith as Joan Ainsley
Glenn Strange as Henchman Tom Slade
Charles King as Vic Landeau, Henchman
I. Stanford Jolley as Mort Slade
Edward Peil Sr. as John Ainsley
Ted Adams as Sundown Sheriff
Slim Whitaker as Texas Sheriff

See also
The "Billy the Kid" films starring Buster Crabbe: 
 Billy the Kid Wanted (1941)
 Billy the Kid's Round-Up (1941)
 Billy the Kid Trapped (1942)
 Billy the Kid's Smoking Guns (1942)
 Law and Order (1942) 
 Sheriff of Sage Valley (1942) 
 The Mysterious Rider (1942)
 The Kid Rides Again (1943)
 Fugitive of the Plains (1943)
 Western Cyclone (1943)
 Cattle Stampede (1943)
 The Renegade (1943)
 Blazing Frontier (1943)
 Devil Riders (1943)
 Frontier Outlaws (1944)
 Valley of Vengeance (1944)
 The Drifter (1944) 
 Fuzzy Settles Down (1944)
 Rustlers' Hideout (1944)
 Wild Horse Phantom (1944)
 Oath of Vengeance (1944)
 His Brother's Ghost (1945) 
 Thundering Gunslingers (1945)
 Shadows of Death (1945)
 Gangster's Den (1945)
 Stagecoach Outlaws (1945)
 Border Badmen (1945)
 Fighting Bill Carson (1945)
 Prairie Rustlers (1945) 
 Lightning Raiders (1945)
 Terrors on Horseback (1946)
 Gentlemen with Guns (1946)
 Ghost of Hidden Valley (1946)
 Prairie Badmen (1946)
 Overland Riders (1946)
 Outlaws of the Plains (1946)

External links 

1943 films
1943 Western (genre) films
American black-and-white films
Billy the Kid (film series)
Films directed by Sam Newfield
American Western (genre) films
1940s English-language films
1940s American films